Crasnîi Vinogradari (Krasnyi Vynohradar, Krasnyi Vinogradar) is a commune in the Dubăsari District of Transnistria, Moldova. It is composed of five villages: Afanasievca (Афанасіївка, Афанасьевка), Alexandrovca Nouă (Нова Олександрівка, Новая Александровка), Calinovca (Калинівка, Калиновка), Crasnîi Vinogradari and Lunga Nouă (Нова Лунга, Новая Лунга). It has since 1990 been administered as a part of the breakaway Pridnestrovian Moldavian Republic (PMR).

References

Communes of Transnistria
Dubăsari District, Transnistria